Porto is the second largest city in Portugal behind the capital, Lisbon.

Overview
Historic references to the city go back to the 4th century BC and to Roman times, although Celtic and Proto-Celtic remnants of ancient Citadels were found in the heart of where Porto now lies. In the Roman period the city developed its importance as a commercial port, primarily in the trade between Olissipona (Lisbon) and Bracara Augusta (nowadays Braga), but would fall under the Moorish Muslim invasion of the Iberian Peninsula in 711. In 868, Vímara Peres, a Christian warlord from Gallaecia and a vassal of the King of Asturias, Léon and Galicia, Alfonso III, was sent to reconquer and secure from the Moors the area from the Minho River to the Douro River, including the city of Portus Cale, later Porto and Gaia, from where the name and political entity of Portugal emerged. In 868 Count Vímara Peres established the County of Portugal, after the reconquest of the region north of the Douro river.

In 1093, Teresa of León, illegitimate daughter of king Alfonso VI of Castile, married Henry of Burgundy, bringing the County of Portugal as dowry.  This Condado Portucalense became the focus of what has been called the Reconquista, and later became the independent Kingdom of Portugal, after eventually expanding to its current frontiers into the south as it conquered territory inhabited by the Moors for centuries, under the reign of King Afonso I of Portugal in the beginning of the 12th century.

In 1387, this city was the scene for the marriage of João I and Philippa of Lancaster, daughter of John of Gaunt, symbolizing the long-standing military alliance between Portugal and England, the world's oldest military alliance, which still holds via NATO.  At the time of his marriage the king stayed at the Church of St. Francis as a proof of his esteem for the Franciscans.

In the 14th and the 15th centuries, the shipyards of Porto contributed to the development of the Portuguese fleet.  In 1415 Henry the Navigator, son of João I, left from Porto to invade the Muslim port of Ceuta in northern Morocco.  This expedition led to the exploratory voyages that he later sent down the coast of Africa. Portuenses are referred to this day as "tripeiros", in reference to the fact that higher quality meat would be loaded onto ships to feed sailors, while off-cuts and by-products such as tripe would be left behind and eaten by the citizens of Porto.  Tripe remains a culturally important dish in modern-day Porto.

In the 13th century, wine produced in the Douro valley, was being transported to Porto in barcos rabelos (flat sailing vessels).  In 1703 the Methuen Treaty established the trade relations between Portugal and England.  It allowed English woolen cloth to be admitted into Portugal free of duty.  In return, Portuguese wines imported into England would be subject to a third less duty in contrast to French imported wines.  This was particularly important with regards to the Port industry.  As England was at war with France it became increasingly difficult to acquire wine and so port started to become a popular replacement. In 1717 a first English trading post was established in Porto.  The production of port wine then gradually passed into the hands of a few English firms.  To counter this English dominance, prime minister Marquis of Pombal established a Portuguese firm receiving the monopoly of the wines from the Douro valley.  He demarcated the region for production of port, to ensure the wine's quality; his was the first attempt to control wine quality and production in Europe.  The small winegrowers revolted against his strict policies on Shrove Tuesday, burning down the buildings of this firm. The revolt was called Revolta dos Borrachos (revolt of the drunks) and became a symbol of the  freedom spirit of the inhabitants of Porto.

Between 1732 and 1763, Italian architect Nicolau Nasoni designed a baroque church with a tower that would become its icon: the Torre dos Clérigos (English: Clerics Tower).

During the 18th and 19th centuries the city became an important industrial centre and saw its size and population increase.  The invasion of the Napoleonic troops in Portugal under Marshal Soult is still vividly remembered in Porto. A day after the French victory at the First Battle of Porto, on 29 March 1809, as the population fled for the advancing troops and tried to cross the river Douro over the Ponte das Barcas (a pontoon bridge), the bridge collapsed under the weight. Possibly 6,000 people drowned in the disaster. This event is still remembered by a plate at the Ponte D. Luis I. The French army was rooted out of Porto by Anglo-Portuguese forces commanded by Arthur Wellesley in the Second Battle of Porto, when his troops crossed the Douro river from the Monastery of Serra do Pilar in a brilliant daylight coup de main.

Influenced by liberal revolutions occurring in Europe, the Liberal Revolution of 1820 started in Porto. The revolutionaries demanded the return of John VI of Portugal, who had transferred the Portuguese Court to the Portuguese colony of Brazil since the French invasions of Portugal, it also demanded a constitutional monarchy to be set up in Portugal. In 1822 a liberal constitution was accepted, partly through the efforts of the liberal assembly of Porto (Junta do Porto). When Miguel of Portugal took the Portuguese throne in 1828, he rejected this constitution and reigned as an absolutist monarch, initiating a civil war.  Porto rebelled again and had to undergo a siege of eighteen months between 1832 and 1833 by the Miguelist army. After the abdication of king Miguel the liberal constitution was re-established. Porto is also called "Cidade Invicta" (English: Unvanquished City) after its resistance to the Miguelist army in the siege of Porto. Unrest by republicans led to a revolt in Porto on 31 January 1891. This would result ultimately in the creation of the Portuguese Republic in 1910.

A two-level iron bridge – Dom Luís I (designed by the Belgian engineer Téophile Seyrig, from 1868 until 1879 the partner Gustave Eiffel), and a railway bridge – Maria Pia, designed by Eiffel in association with Seyrig, were constructed, as well as the central railway station (São Bento, considered to be one of the most beautiful in Europe, ornamented with lavish painted tiles).  A higher learning institution in nautical sciences (Aula de Náutica, 1762) and a stock exchange (Bolsa do Porto, 1834) were established in the city but would be discontinued later.

For having resisted a year-long siege laid by D.Miguel's army during the civil war that took place in the 19th century and opposed King D.Miguel, with the "absolutist" Party to his brother the future king D.Pedro IV with the "liberalist" assuring the victory of the "liberalists" the city was titled By D.Maria, D.pedro's daughter and had become known ever since has the "Ancient, Very Noble, Always loyal Undefeated City" (Antiga, Mui Nobre, Sempre leal, Cidade Invicta).

See also
 Timeline of Porto
 History of Portugal

References

Bibliography

External links

 
Histories of cities in Portugal